The 2008 congressional elections in New Mexico were held on November 4, 2008 to determine New Mexico's representation in the United States House of Representatives. The party primary elections were held June 3, 2008. Martin Heinrich, Harry Teague, and Ben Ray Luján, all Democrats, were elected to represent New Mexico in the House. Representatives are elected for two-year terms; the winners of the election currently serve in the 111th Congress, which began on January 4, 2009 and is scheduled to end on January 3, 2011. The election coincided with the 2008 U.S. presidential election and senatorial elections.

New Mexico has three seats in the House, apportioned according to the 2000 United States Census. Its  2007-2008 congressional delegation consisted of two Republicans and one Democrat. All three incumbents chose to vie for New Mexico's open Senate seat being held by retiring Republican Pete Domenici. The election resulted in all three New Mexico seats are being occupied by freshman Democrats. Districts 1 and 2 changed from Republican to Democratic;  CQ Politics had forecast that these seats might be at risk for the Republican Party. This was the last time that Democrats won all of New Mexico's congressional districts until the 2018 midterm elections. Incidentally, two of the three elected Representatives, Heinrich and Luján, now serve together in the United States Senate since 2021.

Overview

Match-up summary

District 1

This district includes the central area of New Mexico, in and around Albuquerque. An open seat, CQ Politics forecast the race as 'No Clear Favorite'. The Rothenberg Political Report rated it 'Pure Toss-Up'. The Cook Political Report ranked it 'Lean Democratic'.
Martin Heinrich (D) (campaign website)
Darren White (R) (campaign website)
The 2006 race between incumbent Republican Heather Wilson and Democratic state Attorney General Patricia Madrid was a cliffhanger, with Wilson being reelected by 861 votes. John Kerry had narrowly won the district with 52% in 2004 (CPVI=D+2). With the retirement of longtime U.S. Senator Pete Domenici, Wilson ran and lost as a candidate for the Republican nomination in the race for an open U.S. Senate seat, leaving this an open seat. The Democratic nominee was Martin Heinrich (former Albuquerque City Councilor). The Republican nominee was Bernalillo County Sheriff Darren White.
In the general election, Heinrich defeated White by a margin of 11%. When sworn into Congress in January 2009, Heinrich became the first Democrat to ever represent this district in the House.
Race ranking and details from CQ Politics
Campaign contributions from OpenSecrets
White (R) vs Heinrich (D) graph of collected poll results from Pollster.com

Primary elections

General election

District 2

This district covers the southern half of the state of New Mexico, including Las Cruces and Roswell. CQ Politics forecast the race as 'Leans Republican'. The Rothenberg Political Report rated it 'Pure Toss-Up'. The Cook Political Report ranked it 'Republican Toss Up'.

Republican incumbent Steve Pearce won his party's nomination over Heather Wilson for the U.S. Senate, leaving this an open seat. This district usually votes Republican. George W. Bush won the district 58% to 42% over John Kerry in 2004 (CPVI=R+6). Nevertheless, Democratic nominee Harry Teague defeated Republican Edward R. Tinsely III in the general election and is the first Democrat to represent this district since 1981.
Race ranking and details from CQ Politics
Campaign contributions from OpenSecrets

Candidates

Harry Teague (D)
Teague is a Hobbs business owner, civic leader and former Lea County Commissioner.
Harry Teague for Congress official campaign website
 

Edward R. Tinsley III (R)
Tinsley is a restaurateur.
Ed Tinsley for Congress official campaign website

Primary elections

General election

District 3

This district covers the northern half of the state of New Mexico, including the capital, Santa Fe. An open seat, CQ Politics forecast the race as 'Safe Democrat', as did The Rothenberg Political Report and The Cook Political Report.
 Dan East (R)
 Ben R. Luján (D)
 Carol Miller (I)
Democratic incumbent Tom Udall won his party's nomination for Pete Domenici's open U.S. Senate seat,. The Democrats tend to hold the advantage in the district: John Kerry received 54% of the vote there (CPVI=D+6) in 2004. The Democratic nominee was State Public Regulation Commissioner Ben R. Luján. Luján's father serves as Speaker of the New Mexico House of Representatives. The Republican nominee was small business owner Dan East. Carol Miller, a 1997/1998 Green Party candidate, was seeking the seat as an independent.
Luján won the three-way race fairly easily and was sworn into Congress in January 2009.
 Dan East's campaign website
 Ben R. Luján's campaign website
 Carol Miller's campaign website
 Race ranking and details from CQ Politics
 Campaign contributions from OpenSecrets

Primary elections

General election

References
Specific

General
 2008 Competitive House Race Chart The Cook Political Report, October 13, 2008.
 2008 House Ratings The Rothenberg Political Report, October 14, 2008

External links
Elections from the New Mexico Secretary of State
2008 Voters' Guide from the League of Women Voters of New Mexico
U.S. Congress candidates for New Mexico at Project Vote Smart
Campaign contributions for New Mexico congressional races from OpenSecrets
Local/State Election news and Voter Guide from Las Cruces Sun-News''

New Mexico
2008
2008 New Mexico elections